Coccothrinax microphylla is a palm which is endemic to eastern Cuba.

Henderson and colleagues (1995) considered C. microphylla to be a synonym of Coccothrinax pauciramosa.

References

microphylla
Trees of Cuba
Plants described in 1981